Nanotechnology Law & Business is a quarterly peer-reviewed law journal covering all legal, business, and policy aspects of nanotechnology. It was established in 2004 and the editors-in-chief are Don Featherstone (Sterne, Kessler, Goldstein & Fox) and Douglas Jamison (Harris & Harris Group).

Abstracting and indexing 
The journal is abstracted and indexed in Scopus.

References

External links
 

Nanotechnology journals
Quarterly journals
American law journals
English-language journals
Publications established in 2004